Je'Rod LePatrick Cherry (born May 30, 1973) is a former professional football player who currently is a radio talk show host for WKNR AM 850 in Cleveland, and sideline analyst/reporter for the Cleveland Browns radio network.  

He was previously an American football safety in the National Football League (NFL) who played from 1996 to 2004, winning three Super Bowls with the New England Patriots.

Biography
Born in Charlotte, North Carolina, Cherry graduated from Berkeley High School at Berkeley, California in 1991 and was a standout athlete in football and track.

Cherry red-shirted his freshman year and played on the California Golden Bears football team from 1992 to 1995. In his senior season, Cherry had 91 tackles and an interception and returned 18 kickoffs for a 21.4 yard average. For his junior and senior years, Cherry was an All-Pac-10 honorable mention and Pac-10 All-Academic selection. With a 3.2 GPA, Cherry received his Bachelor of Arts degree in political science from UC Berkeley in 1996 and a Master of Arts in education from the University of California, Berkeley Graduate School of Education in 2000.

He was drafted by the New Orleans Saints in the 1996 NFL Draft. In 2000, Cherry signed with the Oakland Raiders, then a month later he signed with the Philadelphia Eagles.  After his stint with the Eagles, Cherry signed with the New England Patriots, where he earned Super Bowl rings in Super Bowls XXXVI, XXXVIII, and XXXIX as a special teams player before retiring in 2004.

Cherry made an immediate impact for the Patriots on special teams in 2001 and 2002.  In 2001, he tied for 3rd in ST tackles with 12 and led the Patriots with 6 ST tackles during their Super Bowl run in the postseason.  In 2002, he again ranked 3rd in ST tackles with 12 during the regular season.  During the 2003 regular season, he finished with 13 ST tackles and recorded 1 ST tackle in the Super Bowl against Carolina.  In 2004, Cherry again recorded 13 ST tackles and had 2 ST tackles against Pittsburgh in the AFC Championship Game.

Post-NFL career
After his retirement, Cherry moved to Macedonia, Ohio, and in 2009 became a talk show host and NFL analyst for WKNR AM 850 in Cleveland. In 2013, following WKNR becoming a flagship station for the Cleveland Browns, Cherry also became a game-day pregame host for the Browns radio network. In 2022, he became part of the main game broadcast team as sideline analyst and reporter.

Cherry is a Christian and attends Bible studies with other players. Each year, Cherry goes to Heartland Community Church in Medina, Ohio, where he discusses his work as a sports analyst and his spiritual journey with the congregation there. In 2008, Cherry raffled off his first Super Bowl ring with the proceeds going to charity.  The event raised over $200,000.  The ring is currently with a collector in Ottawa, Ontario, Canada.

Awards and honors
 Two-time All Pac-10 Academic Team - 1994, 1995
 Three-time Super Bowl winner - XXXVI, XXXVIII, XXXIX (as a member of the New England Patriots)

References

External links
 New England Player Page

1973 births
Living people
Sportspeople from Berkeley, California
American football safeties
Berkeley High School (Berkeley, California) alumni
California Golden Bears football players
New England Patriots players
New Orleans Saints players
Oakland Raiders players
Philadelphia Eagles players
Sportspeople from Charlotte, North Carolina
Players of American football from Berkeley, California
Players of American football from Charlotte, North Carolina
American sports radio personalities
UC Berkeley Graduate School of Education alumni
People from Macedonia, Ohio